The Black Rose is a 1950 American-British adventure film directed by Henry Hathaway and starring Tyrone Power and Orson Welles.
 
Talbot Jennings' screenplay was loosely based on a 1945 novel of the same name by Canadian author Thomas B. Costain, introducing an anachronistic Saxon rebellion against the Norman aristocracy as a vehicle for launching the protagonists on their journey to the Orient.

It was filmed partly on location in England and Morocco which substitutes for the Gobi Desert of China. The film was partly conceived as a follow-up to the movie Prince of Foxes (1949), and reunited the earlier film's two male leads.

British costume designer Michael Whittaker was nominated at the 23rd Academy Awards for his work on the film (Best Costumes-Color).

Plot

Two hundred years after the Norman Conquest, during the reign of Edward I, Saxon scholar Walter of Gurnie, the illegitimate son of the lately deceased Earl of Lessford, returns from Oxford and hears the reading of his father's will. He receives only a pair of boots, but Walter recognizes it as a token of his father's love for him. The earl's Norman widow takes Saxon hostages against possible unrest. Walter joins a group of Saxons who free them, but is forced to flee England when he is recognized.

Walter, accompanied by his friend Tristram Griffen, a Saxon archer, sets out to make his fortune in Cathay (China) during the time of the Pax Mongolica.  The pair join a caravan bearing gifts from the merchant Anthemus to Kublai Khan, who is preparing to invade Cathay. The caravan is under the protection of Mongol general Bayan of the Hundred Eyes. Impressed by Tristram's archery skill and his English longbow and Walter's scholarship, Bayan takes an interest in the Englishmen.

Lu Chung, the head of the caravan, blackmails Walter into assisting the escape of Maryam, Anthemus's half-English sister, nicknamed the "Black Rose", being sent as one of the gifts. Maryam loves Walter, but he is too interested in his adventure to pay her any attention. Tristram does not like all the killing and decides to get away. He takes Maryam with him because she wants to go to England.

Bayan sends Walter on a mission to see the Song dynasty Empress of that part of Cathay not yet under Mongol rule. When he arrives, he is told that he must stay in Cathay as a "guest" for the rest of his life. Then he finds Tristram and Maryam had also been captured and imprisoned. During this time, Walter realizes he loves Maryam. The three of them decide to escape. Tristram dies. The small boat in which Maryam is waiting for Walter in drifts away before Walter can catch her. Walter returns to England alone.

Walter is welcomed back by the Norman King Edward because of all the cultural and scientific knowledge (including gunpowder) he has brought back from China. The king knights Walter and grants him a coat of arms. Two Mongol emissaries from Bayan show up. They have brought the Black Rose to England to join Walter there.

Cast
 Tyrone Power as Walter of Gurnie
 Orson Welles as Bayan of the Hundred Eyes
 Cécile Aubry as Maryam
 Jack Hawkins as Tristram Griffen
 Michael Rennie as King Edward I
 Finlay Currie as Alfgar
 Herbert Lom as Anthemus
 Mary Clare as Eleanor, Countess of Lessford
 Robert Blake as Mahmoud
 Alfonso Bedoya as Lu Chung (voice dubbed by Peter Sellers, uncredited)
 Gibb McLaughlin as Wilderkin
 James Robertson Justice as Simeon Beautrie
 Henry Oscar as Friar Roger Bacon
 Laurence Harvey as Edmond

Production
The Black Rose was the first film Henry Hathaway directed after an operation for cancer. He had a doctor with him on set. Hathaway later said he felt the movie was badly cast, saying Jack Hawkins was "too old" for his role ("it should have been played by someone like Van Johnson") and that Cécile Aubry "didn't have a lick of sense. I tried to get Leslie Caron but Caron said she loved ballet and didn't want to be in pictures." He also says he and Orson Welles got along "terrible" because Welles would not follow direction. "It pleased him to outwit people. That was the trouble with him throughout his career."

Reception
Trade papers called the film a "notable box office attraction" in British cinemas in 1950.

See also
The Great Wall (2016)
List of historical drama films

Notes and references

Notes

Citations

External links
 
 
 
 

1950 films
1950s historical films
American historical films
1950s English-language films
Films based on Canadian novels
Films set in the 13th century
Films set in England
Films set in China
Films set in the Yuan dynasty
Films directed by Henry Hathaway
Films scored by Richard Addinsell
20th Century Fox films
Cultural depictions of Edward I of England
1950s American films